Hameed Jumaa Saad Allah Al-Gheilani (born 4 May 1984), commonly known as Hameed Al-Gheilani, is an Omani footballer who plays for Al-Seeb Club in Oman Professional League.

Club career
On 28 August 2014, he signed a one-year contract with Al-Seeb Club.

Club career statistics

International career
Hameed is part of the first team squad of the Oman national football team. He was selected for the national team for the first time in 2012. He made his first appearance for Oman on 30 January 2013 in a friendly match against China in 2013. He has represented the national team in the 2010 FIFA World Cup qualification, the 2014 FIFA World Cup qualification and the 2015 AFC Asian Cup qualification.

Honours
Al-Oruba
Omani Super Cup: 2011

References

External links
 
 
 Hameed Al-Gheilani at Goal.com 
 
 

1984 births
Living people
People from Muscat, Oman
Omani footballers
Oman international footballers
Omani expatriate footballers
Association football midfielders
Sur SC players
Al-Orouba SC players
Al-Nahda Club (Oman) players
Al-Seeb Club players
Oman Professional League players